Cape Columbine is well known for its lighthouse, the last staffed lighthouse built on the South African coast. . The Cape Columbine Lighthouse was commissioned on October 1, 1936. Both the headland and lighthouse derive their name from the barque Columbine, that was wrecked 1.5 km North of the lighthouse on March 31, 1829 .

South African lighthouse firsts
 First to receive three navigational aids: light, a fog signal and a radio beacon.
 First lens system designed for use with a 4 kW incandescent electric lamp.

Shipwrecks
Several ships were wrecked in the area, which is known for its multitude of submerged rocks and reefs.

 Columbine 1829
  1899
 SS Saint Lawrence 1876
 SS Lisboa 1910
 SS Haddon Hall 1913
 SS Malmesbury 1930
 Haleric 1932
 Da Gama 1979
 SS Columbine 1944 (Torpedoed)

Climate

Surrounds
The Columbine Nature Reserve surrounds Cape Columbine Lighthouse. On the southern side of the lighthouse is Tieties Bay. 5 km away is the fishing village of Paternoster. The coastline is well known for its sea life, especially for crawfish and abalone. Langebaan Lagoon, the West Coast National Park and a Fossil Park.

External links 
 National Ports Authority: Cape Columbine

References 

Along the West Coast of South Africa: Cape Columbine
South African Department of Public Enterprises: LAUNCH OF THE SOUTH AFRICAN LIGHTHOUSE ADVENTURE TOUR OPERATIONS

Columbine, Cape